The Xhosa nation has two independent kingships, with the Gcaleka Xhosa, being the senior branch as the Great House of King Phalo kaTshiwo and the Rharhabe Xhosa, the junior branch as the Right Hand House of King Phalo kaTshiwo. 
 King Ahlangene Sigcawu Aa! Vulikhaya!, King of all amaXhosa and leader of amaGcaleka, Nqadu Great Place, Willowvale
 King Jonguxolo Sandile  Aa! Vul'ulwandle!, King of the AmaRharhabe Xhosa, Mngqesha Great Place, King William's Town
 Chief Viwe Mdalu ka Xabadiya, Aa!! Bhungaliwile 
INkosi enkulu kumaZizi akwaLamyeni
Mbolompo Great Place - Mthatha
 Chief Sisanda Sipuxolo Burns-Ncamashe, Chief AmaGwali Traditional Council, Alice
 Chief Langalivelile Mabandla Ah! Ntabayikhonjwa, Chief of AmaBhele ase Tyhume Tradition Council, Alice
 Chief Khayalethu Mqalo Ah! Gcinisizwe, Chief of AmaKhuze Traditional Council, Alice
 Chief Mzukisi Bongani Tyali "Ah!Dibanisa'hlanga" Chief of Imingcangathelo Traditional Council, Alice
Chief Banzi Oscar Tyali “Chief of Imingcangathelo yomntla Thyume Alice
Chief Mhlangabezi Siyasanga Tyali “Chief of Imingcangathelo yomzantsi Thyume, Alice
 Chief Xabiso Zulu Ah! Zanobuhle, Chief of AmaHlubi akwaRharhabe, Sheshegu, Alice
 Chief Langa Mavuso Ah! Zwelidumile, Chief of Gaga Traditional Council, Alice
 Chief Lwanda Siyolo Jongilanga Ah! Zwelidumile, Chief of ImiDushane Yaselwandle, Ncera Great Place, East London
 Chief Phato Ah! Zweliyandila, Chief of Amagqunukhwebe ase Lwandle, Tsholomnqa, East London
 Chieftainess Nosiseko Gaika, Chief of Amambombo (Ngqika), Keiskammahoek
 Chief Ndlovu Ulana, Chief of AmaZizi, Keiskammahoek
 Chief Richard Barney Kubashe Ah! Ntabazijongene, Chief of ImiDange, King William's Town
 Chief Ludwe Siwani Ah! Ngubesizwe, Chief of ImiDushane, Tamarha Great Place, King William's Town
 Chieftainess Nomasilakhe Komani, Chief of Imingqalasi, Bhisho
 Chief Sibulele Mhlambiso, Chief of AmaNgqika-Mbo Traditional Council, Middledrift
 Chieftainess Nombulelo Arnoria Kama, Chief of AmaGqunukhwebe Traditional Council, Middledrift
 Chief Siseko Msobomvu Maqoma, Chief of AmaJingqi Traditional Council, Seymour
 Chief Andile Makinana Ah! Mhlanganisi, Chief of AmaNdlambe Traditional Council, Tshabo 
 Chief Hamilton Mxolisi Makinana Ah! Zwelihlangene, Chief of AmaHala, Peddie 
 Chief Zolile Njokweni Ah! Vusuhlanga, Chief of AmaDabi, Peddie
 Chief Siviwe Bebeza Ah! Zanoxolo, Chief of AmaVundle, Ntabethemba, Queenstown
 Chief Simon Viwe Hebe Ah! Siviwe, Chief of AmaHala (Thembu), Zweledinga, Whittlesea
 Chief Xhanti Zimema, Chief of ZuluKama, Hewu, Whittlesea
 Chief Mabhelonke Majeke Ah! Zamukulungisa, Chief of AmaBhele, Qumbu
 Chief Onesimo Langeni Ah! Skhosana, Chief of AmaBhele AseLangeni, Mthatha

 Chief Mekeni Pikisa, Chief of ImiDushane Traditional Council, Centane
 Chief Mthandeni-maBhele Mabandla Ah! Mathandela, Chief of AmaBhele, Tsolo
 Chief Ngangomzi Pokwana Ah! Jongumhlaba, Chief of AmaZizi, DutywaAmavundle Ngoo Tyhali 
 Chief Mdedeleni Ngubenani Ah! Zwelinjani, Chief of AmaTshezi, Mthonjana, Mqanduli
 Chief Mandla Mandela Ah! Zwelivelile, Chief of Mvezo Traditional Council
 Chief Sango Phathekile Holomisa Ah! Dilizintaba, Chief of AmaHegebe, Mqanduli
 Chief Mzwandile Nelson Ntsokwana, "Aah! Zwelivumile", Chief of Amagcina, Ncora, Cofimvaba, Eastern Cape 
 Chief Manonwana Mpangele, Ah! Zwelixolile, Chief of AmaGcina, Lady Frere, Eastern Cape
 Chief Samuel Siganeko, Ah!Jolirhamba, Chief of AmaGcina, Lady Frere, Eastern Cape
 Chief Zwelakhe Dalasile, Aah! Zwelakhe, Chief of AmaQwathi, Engcobo, Eastern Cape
Chief Zululiyazongoma Mnqanqeni, " Aah Zululiyazongoma" Chief of Abathembu tribe, Engcobo, Clarkebury.
 Chief Dumisani Mgudlwa, Aah ! Zwelenqaba, Chief of amaJumba, Engcobo
 Chief Claude Msutu Ah! Zwelinzima, of the Msutu Clan of the Amazizi Tribe Qeto Great Place, Peddie, Eastern Cape
 Chief Ntombizodwa Msutu Ah! Zanokhanyo, of the Amazizi tribe Qeto Great Place, Peddie, Eastern Cape
 Chief Nkosinathi Jezile Aah! Daluxolo Chief of Amagcina tribe Engcobo Sinqumeni Great Place
 Chief Viwe Mdalu ka Xabadiya Aa!! Bhungaliwile INkosi enkulu kumazizi akawalamyeni (Mbolompo Great Place) Mthatha
 Regent Nkosi (kazi) Nondumiso Pumela Ngonyama "Aah Nobongo", Regent Senior Traditional Leader  of Cacadu Traditional Authority, Mpunzana Great Place, Mthatha
 Chief Sibongile Dumalisile, Chief of Jingqi Traditional Council, Willowvale
 Chief Matshawonke Mtoto, Chief of Mtoto Traditional Council, Willowvale
 Chief Msondezi Sigcawu, Chief of Kwa Mkoloza Traditional Council, Willowvale
Chief Luyanda Magxwalisa, Ah!Vulisango, the Chief of Mevana Traditional Council, Willowvale 
 Chief Xhanti Sigcawu, Chief of Mbashe Traditional Council, Dutywa
 Chief Ahlangene Sigcawu, Chief of Keti Traditional Council, Dutywa 
 Chief Mzubanzi Wellington Jali, Chief of ImiQhayi Traditional Council, Peddie
 Chief Mzimasi Tyali, Chief of Anta Traditional Council, Seymour
Chief Bongani Gecelo, Aah Zwelandile (CaLa)
 Chief Melisizwe Mhlontlo, Aaah Thandisizwe, Chief of AmaGcina, Lady Frere, Eastern Cape. 
 Prince Cwenga Buhle Jezile, Ahh !! ZWELIDUMILE, Prince of AmaGcina Sinqumeni great place Engcobo. Eastern Cape.
Chief Zwelenkosi Dalasile.Ahh Zwelenkosi !! Chief of AmaQwathi.AmaQwathi Traditional Council Nkondlo Great Place, Ngcobo Eastern cape
Chief Zwelenqaba Dimisani Mgudlwa of amaDlomo at Qhumanco Falo Mgudlwa.

See also

Gcaleka
Rharhabe
List of rulers of the Gcaleka
List of rulers of the Rharhabe
List of Xhosa Kings
List of Xhosa people

Xhosa chiefs

Chieftainships